Western Scottish Motor Traction Co. Limited was a bus operator in south-west Scotland from 1929 to 1985.

The company was formed in 1929 by the renaming of Scottish General Transport Co. Ltd, after the  British Electric Traction subsidiary formed in 1913 was acquired by the Scottish Motor Traction group. The SMT group was nationalised in 1949, and Western SMT became part of the Scottish Bus Group. In preparation for privatisation, the company was split into Clydeside Scottish and Western Scottish in 1985.

In 1984 the company operated buses from depots in the following locations:
Ayr, with sub-depot at Girvan
Cumnock
Dumfries, with sub-depots at Annan, Kirkcudbright and Lockerbie
Carlisle
Greenock
Inchinnan
Johnstone, with sub-depot at Largs
Kilmarnock
Thornliebank, with sub-depot at Ardrishaig
Paisley
Port Ellen on Islay
Rothesay
Stranraer, with sub-depot at Wigtown

Sources

A.W. Neuls, National Bus Company and Scottish Bus Group Fleet List, Shepperton, 1984

Defunct companies of Scotland
Former bus operators in Scotland